Beno Zephine N L (born 17 April 1990) is an Indian diplomat who has been serving as an Indian Foreign Service (IFS) Officer since 2014. She is the first 100% visually impaired officer in the IFS.

Early life and background 
Beno was born on 17 April 1990 in Chennai, India to Luke Anthon Charles, an employee of Indian Railways and Mary Padmaja, a home maker. 
She did her schooling in Little Flower Convent Higher Secondary school for the blind in Chennai, obtained under graduation in English literature from Stella Maris College, Chennai, and further did her post graduation in Loyola College, Chennai.

References

1990 births
Living people
Stella Maris College, Chennai alumni